Tosunlu can refer to:

 Tosunlu, Ardanuç
 Tosunlu, Aşkale
 Tosunlu, Karayazı
 Tosunlu, Kayapınar